The  is a concrete gravity dam on the Li River in Naha, Okinawa Prefecture, Japan. Construction on the dam began in 1989 and it was completed in 2000.

References

External links 

 Personal account and visual tour of Kinjo Dam 

Dams in Okinawa Prefecture
Gravity dams
Naha
Dams completed in 2000